John M. Callahan was Chairman of the Democratic Party of Wisconsin.

Career
Callahan was chaired the Democratic Party of Wisconsin from 1925 to 1927. He was twice a candidate for Secretary of State of Wisconsin. In 1910, he lost to incumbent and future U.S. Representative James A. Frear and in 1924, he lost to incumbent a future Governor of Wisconsin Fred R. Zimmerman. Callahan was a delegate to the 1924 Democratic National Convention. At the convention, his name was put into play for the Democratic Party's nominee for President of the United States. The nomination eventually went to John W. Davis, who lost to incumbent Calvin Coolidge in the general election. Callahan was also a delegate to the 1928 Democratic National Convention. In 1934, he was a candidate for the United States Senate, losing to incumbent Robert M. La Follette Jr.

References

Democratic Party of Wisconsin chairs
Year of birth missing
Year of death missing
Wisconsin Democrats